Bazargani Javaheri Gonbad Volleyball Club is an Iranian professional volleyball team based in Gonbad-e Kavus, Iran. They compete in the Iranian Volleyball Super League.

Sponsorship names
Neopan (1996–2006)
Esteghlal (2006–2008)
Padisan (2008–2009)
Bazargani Javaheri (2009–2011)
Bazargani Javaheri (2012–present)

Current squad
1.  Mehran Zare
3.  Abdolmajid Chogan
4.  Sakhi Eidi
6.  Ehsan Davaji
7.  Masoud Azizi
8.  Mohammad Reza Soleimani
10.  Mohammad Amin Hassanzadeh
11.  Abdollah Nazeri
13.  Kamal Ghoreishi
14.  Matin Takavar
15.  Golmohammad Sakhavi
17.  Vafa Zeinounli
18.  Hamid Mohammadalegh
19.  João Ricardo Silva
Heach coach:  Baimohammad Davaji
Assistant coach:  Ahad Armashi

References

External links
 Rosters

Iranian volleyball clubs